The Ambassador of Malaysia to the People's Democratic Republic of Algeria is the head of Malaysia's diplomatic mission to Algeria. The position has the rank and status of an Ambassador Extraordinary and Plenipotentiary and is based in the Embassy of Malaysia, Algiers.

List of heads of mission

Ambassadors to Algeria

See also
 Algeria–Malaysia relations

References 

 
Algeria
Malaysia